Benito James Distefano (born January 23, 1962) is an American former professional baseball player. He played in Major League Baseball (MLB) with the Pittsburgh Pirates and Houston Astros in the 1980s and with Navegantes del Magallanes in the Liga Venezolana de Béisbol Profesional. He is currently a minor league coach in the New York Mets organization.

Information
Distefano remains the most recent left-handed-throwing player to catch an MLB game, catching in three separate games for the Pirates in 1989.

On April 28, 1992, David Cone of the New York Mets brought a no-hitter into the eighth inning. Distefano broke it up with an infield hit.

In 2010, Distefano was hired by the New York Mets to serve as the hitting coach for the Single A Brooklyn Cyclones.
After serving as the hitting coach for the Class A St. Lucie Mets of the Florida State League for a few years, Distefano returned to Brooklyn for the 2014 season.

Distefano was named as the bench coach for the Syracuse Mets of the New York Mets organization for the 2019 season. In 2020-21, Distefano was a roving instructor in the Mets' system.

References

External links
, or Pelota Binaria (Venezuelan Winter League) http://www.elemergente.com/2012/07/recuerdan-al-magallanero-benny.html

1962 births
Living people
Águilas Cibaeñas players
American expatriate baseball players in the Dominican Republic
Alvin Community College alumni
Alvin Dolphins baseball players
American expatriate baseball players in Canada
American expatriate baseball players in Japan
American people of Italian descent
Baseball coaches from New York (state)
Brooklyn Cyclones coaches
Buffalo Bisons (minor league) players
Calgary Cannons players
Chunichi Dragons players
Greenwood Pirates players
Hawaii Islanders players
Houston Astros players
Lafayette High School (New York City) alumni
Lynn Pirates (1983) players
Major League Baseball catchers
Major League Baseball first basemen
Major League Baseball outfielders
Navegantes del Magallanes players
American expatriate baseball players in Venezuela
Oklahoma City 89ers players
Pittsburgh Pirates players
Rochester Red Wings players
Sportspeople from Brooklyn
Baseball players from New York City
Tiburones de La Guaira players
Tucson Toros players
Vancouver Canadians players